Jane Henriot (born Jeanne Angèle Grossin 28 April 1878 – 8 March 1900) was an actress at the Comédie-Française and a model for the French artist Pierre-Auguste Renoir posing in Fillette au chapeau bleu (English: Little girl in blue hat) in 1881 when she was a child. She died having suffocated and asphyxiated in an explosion and fire at the Comédie-Française having tried to save her little dog.

Early life

Henriot was born in 21 Rue de la Tour-d'Auvergne, 9th arrondissement of Paris, Île-de-France, France. Her mother Marie Henriette Alphonsine Grossin was also an actress and model for Renoir. Henriot used the same surname as a stage name as her mother, who was known as Henriette Henriot.

She studied at the Conservatoire d’art dramatique de Paris. where she became the mistress of actor and director Charles le Bargy, who was her professor at the time. He eventually left her to marry Madame Simone, who was no happier with her than he had been with Henriot.

Professional career

Henriot posed for the French artist Pierre-Auguste Renoir in the painting Fillette au chapeau bleu (English: Little girl in blue hat) in 1881 when she was still a child. 
 
Henriot made her debut at the Comédie-Française as a leading actress as Myrtha in La Douceur de croire by Jacques Normand on 8 July 1899. Le Monde artiste remarked Henriot was a "little dreamlike and charming infant whose sweet voice made one think of the chirping of birds, a delicious creature, very cute in its juvenile grace" (March 11, 1900, p. 156). She was loved by both the public and critics.

Stage career

Plays that Henriot acted in at the Comédie-Française from 8 July 1899:

 Myrtha in La Douceur de croire by Jacques Normand 
 Sylvette in Les Romanesques by Edmond Rostand
 Hippolyta (Hippolyte) in L'Étourdi ou les Contretemps by Molière
 Bertrade in Grisélidis by Armand Silvestre and Eugène Morand.
 Lucile in Le Dépit amoureux by Molière
 Isabelle in Le Légataire universel by Jean-François Regnard
 Lucinde in Le Médecin malgré lui by Molière
 Céphise in Andromaque by Jean Racine
 Juliette in Diane de lys by Alexandre Dumas fils
 Zaïre in Bajazet by Jean Racine, which she played from 1 March 1900 until her death.

Death, funeral and memorial service

Just before noon on 8 March 1900, after a matinee where she was playing the role of the confidant Zaïde in Jean Racine's play Bajazet
at the Comédie-Française, an explosion and fire broke out. Henriot was on the fourth floor of the theater. Her dresser had a better knowledge of place and could find her own way out and through a window. Mary Marquet told her to get out of the fire, however Henriot was trying to find her little dog, which was a gift from Le Bargy, whom she had recently broken-up with. Henriot was still wandered around the building when she died of asphyxiation. Her body was later found, but it was unrecognisable, her face blackened, burnt hair and body convulsed. Her mother identified the body in the morgue.

Two days later, a large crowd gathered at her funeral, and the convoy passed through Paris to the church of Saint-Honoré-d'Eylau, the Montmartre cemetery. Shortly after her death, the Comédie-Française wanted a portrait of Henriot. On the advice of her mother, they gave the portrait painter Carolus-Duran the task of making a portrait of Henriot, having previous painted another actress Jeanne Samary in 1885. Carolus-Duran had known Henriot and was inspired by the photographs taken by Reutlinger, which were published on postcards.

A year after her death on 8 March 1901, a memorial service was held in Saint-Roch, Paris, where her friends went to her tomb which was sculpted by Denys Puech above a white marble monument by the architect Marcel Dourgnon with the following words having been engraved on the base of the tomb: "À Jane Henriot, la Comédie-Française" (English: To Jane Henriot, the French-Comedy), with an inscription taken from an article by Émile Faguet: ...Elle est venue, Elle a souri, Elle a passé! (English: She came, She smiled, She has passed!)

Gallery

See also
 Belle Époque
 Theatre of France

References

Sources
 Henry Lyonnet, Dictionnaire des comédiens français

External links 
 

1878 births
1900 deaths
Actresses from Paris
French child models
Burials at Passy Cemetery